Pablo Zarnicki (born 12 November 1972 Bulnes) is an Argentine chess player.

He won at Mar del Plata 1989.
In 1992, Zarnicki won the World Junior Chess Championship at Buenos Aires.

He represented Argentina in five Chess Olympiads.
 In 1992, at second reserve board in 30th Chess Olympiad in Manila (+3 –1 =5);
 In 1994, at fourth board in 31st Chess Olympiad in Moscow (+8 –0 =5);
 In 1996, at third board in 32nd Chess Olympiad in Yerevan (+5 –1 =6);
 In 2002, at third board in 35th Chess Olympiad in Bled (+3 –1 =7);
 In 2006, at first reserve board in 37th Chess Olympiad in Turin (+5 –2 =2).
He won individual silver medal on board four at Moscow 1994.

Zarnicki was awarded with the Konex Award as one of the 5 best chess players of the decade in his country. He was awarded the Grandmaster title in 1994.

References

External links 

1972 births
Living people
People from Buenos Aires Province
Chess grandmasters
Argentine chess players
Argentine people of Polish descent
World Junior Chess Champions
Chess Olympiad competitors